The Chittenden-5-2 Representative District is a one-member state Representative district in the U.S. state of Vermont.  It is one of the 108 one- or two-member districts into which the state was divided by the redistricting and reapportionment plan developed by the Vermont General Assembly following the 2000 U.S. Census.  The plan applies to legislatures elected in 2002, 2004, 2006, 2008, and 2010.  A new plan will be developed in 2012 following the 2010 U.S. Census.

The Chittenden-5-2 District includes all of the Chittenden County town of St. George and that part of Shelburne not included in Chittenden-5-1.

As of the 2000 census, the state as a whole had a population of 608,827. As there are a total of 150 representatives, there were 4,059 residents per representative (or 8,118 residents per two representatives). The one-member Chittenden-5-2 District had a population of 3,776 in that same census, 6.97% below the state average.

District Representative 
Stephen B. Dates,   Republican

See also 
Members of the Vermont House of Representatives, 2005-2006 session
Vermont Representative Districts, 2002-2012

External links 
Detail map of the Chittenden-1-1, Chittenden-1-2, Chittenden-5-1, and Chittenden-5-2 districts (PDF)
Vermont Statute defining legislative districts
 Vermont House districts -- Statistics (PDF)

Vermont House of Representatives districts, 2002–2012
Shelburne, Vermont
St. George, Vermont